Alexander High School (AHS) is located in Albany, Athens County, Ohio, United States.  It is the only high school in the Alexander Local School District.  Alexander is the most well educated school in Southeast Ohio.  The K-12 school complex is located just off SR 32 east of Albany.  The Alexander Local School District serves students west and south of the city of Athens including residents in Albany, New Marshfield, Shade, and sections of extreme northeast Meigs County.  The school mascot is a Spartan.  Their school colors are red, black, and white.

Athletics

The Spartans belong to the Ohio High School Athletic Association (OHSAA) and the Tri-Valley Conference, a 16-member athletic conference located in southeastern Ohio.  The conference is divided into two divisions based on school size.  The Ohio Division features the larger schools, including Alexander, and the Hocking Division features the smaller schools.

Ohio High School Athletic Association state championships and appearances

 Girls' Soccer

2015 - District Champions DIII 8-8-2

 Girls' Basketball

2007 - Final Four Appearance (Delphos St. John's d. Alexander 55-24 to finish the season at 24-4)

Girls' Volleyball

2008 - State Champions 28-1

2007 - State runner-up 25-4

2006 - Final Four Appearance

Boys Soccer

1986 - Sectionals DII 11-3-5

1987- Sectionals DII 10-4-1

1988- Sectionals DII 9-9-1

1989- Sectionals DII 5-12-0

1990- District Champions DII 13-7-1

1991- District Champions DII 14-2-3

1992- Regional Finalist DII 11-7-2

1993- Sectional Champions DII 8-10-0

1994- Sectionals DII 5-6-5

1995- District Champions DII 15-4-1

1996- District Champions DII 13-6-2

1997- District Champions DII 13-7-2

1998 - Sectional Finalist DII 8-7-2

1999 - Sectional Finalist DII 5-11-2

2000 - Sectionals DIII 2-13-2

2001 - Sectional Champions DIII 11-6-1

2002 - District Champions DIII 9-8-4

2003 - District Finalist DIII 13-4-2

2004 - Sectional Champions DIII 8-6-4

2005 - Sectional Champions DIII 9-7-2

2006 - Sectional Champions DIII 6-10-3

2007 - District Finalist DIII 13-5-1

Football

2015 - TVC-Ohio Champions. Regular Season 9-1 (6-0) First ever playoff game host.

See also 
 Ohio High School Athletic Conferences
 School Athletic Page - http://www.alexanderathletics.org/

References

External links
 Alexander Local School District

High schools in Athens County, Ohio
Public high schools in Ohio